Pheasants Nest is a small village in the Macarthur Region of New South Wales, Australia, in Wollondilly Shire. It has a north bound and south bound roadhouse on the Hume Highway. Pheasants Nest also serves as a freeway exit between Picton and Yerrinbool.

Pheasants Nest was named after the Lyrebird, local to the Bargo area, which was mistakenly called a pheasant by early explorers.

Organisations

Pheasants Nest Rural Fire Brigade

The Pheasants Nest Rural Fire Brigade consists of a two bay tin station. Housed in the station is the brigade's Cat 1 Tanker, code name Pheasants Nest 1 and the brigade's Cat 9 vehicle, code name Pheasants Nest 9.

Notes and references

Towns in New South Wales
Towns in the Macarthur (New South Wales)
Wollondilly Shire